Ellingham is a village and civil parish in the English county of Norfolk. The majority of the population lies in the east of the parish in Kirby Row.

History
Ellingham's name is of Anglo-Saxon origin and derives from the Old English for either Ella's homestead or village or a settlement with an abundance of eels.

Archaeological evidence suggests that Ellingham was the site of several roughly five Roman kilns, one of the kilns was operated by Regalis, who moved to the parish from Camulodunum.

In the Domesday Book, Ellingham is listed as a settlement of 31 households in the hundred of Clavering. In 1086, the village was part of the East Anglian estates of King William I.

Ellingham Mill was in operation from the Twelfth Century to 1964, grinding crops into either flour or animal feed. The mill still stands today and is awaiting a conservation plan from Norfolk Heritage. In the late Nineteenth Century, Ellingham Mill was the site of the grim discovery of the bodies of Mr. and Mrs. Harlev of Beccles in the River Waveney, the official inquest ruled that the deaths were the result of suicide. Furthermore, the mill was owned and operated by Hovis from 1947 to 1949.

Ellingham was also the site of the discovery of mid-Seventeenth Century firearm with a pillbox being installed on the bridge crossing the River Waveney during the Second World War.

Geography
According to the 2011 Census, Ellingham has a population of 554 residents living in 261 households.

Ellingham falls within the constituency of South Norfolk and is represented at Parliament by Richard Bacon MP of the Conservative Party. For the purposes of local government, the parish falls within the district of South Norfolk.

St. Mary's Church
Ellingham's parish church is dedicated to Saint Mary and dates from the Nineteenth Century. St. Mary's has good examples of Nineteenth and Twentieth Century stained glass depicting the Annunciation, Christ the Shepherd and the Parable of the Sower with St. Mary's tower in the background, installed by Reginald Bell with further depictions of the Adoration of the Magi by Charles Eamer Kempe and Naomi and Ruth by Ward and Hughes.

Ellingham Hall

Ellingham Hall is an Eighteenth Century manor house built in the Georgian style and was first inhabited Rev. William Johnson. Today, the hall operates as an organic farm, wedding venue and shooting venue. Today, the hall is owned by Vaughan Smith who infamously offered refuge to Julian Assange between 2010 and 2011.

Transport
Ellingham is bisected by the A143 between Great Yarmouth and Haverhill.

Ellingham railway station opened in 1863 as a stop on the Waveney Valley Line between Tivetshall and Beccles. Beccles remains open and is Ellingham's closest railway station.

Notable Residents
 Vaughan Smith (b.1963)- English soldier, farmer and journalist
 Julian Assange (b.1971)- Australian publisher and activist

War Memorial
Ellingham's war memorial takes the form of a stone column topped with a crucifix located in St. Mary's Churchyard. The memorial lists the following names for the First World War:
 L-Sgt. Leonard A. Watson (1895-1918), 9th Battalion, Royal Norfolk Regiment
 L-Cpl. George W. Norman (1889-1918), 6th Battalion, Royal Dublin Fusiliers
 L-Cpl. Samuel J. Cossey (1877-1916), Royal Marines att. HMS Lion
 L-Cpl. Nelson V. Cossey (1888-1916), 3rd Battalion, Rifle Brigade
 Pvt. Edgar C. Cossey (1879-1918), 2nd Battalion, Coldstream Guards
 Pvt. Leonard W. Everitt (1895-1916), 4th Battalion, Gloucestershire Regiment
 Pvt. George Baldry (d.1918), 1/7th Battalion, Middlesex Regiment
 Pvt. George A. Shawl (1893-1916), 7th Battalion, Suffolk Regiment
 Albert E. Hood
 William Ward

And, the following for the Second World War:
 Dvr. L. Stanley Rumsey (1912-1947), Royal Army Service Corps
 Pvt. Alice M. Curtis (d.1941), Auxiliary Territorial Service
 Pvt. Raymond E. G. Burcham (1915-1943), 4th Battalion, Royal Norfolk Regiment
 Pvt. Edward H. Church (1919-1944), 244th Company, Royal Pioneer Corps
 Skp. R. Arthur J. W. Page (d.1942), H.M. Trawler Fir
 Hebert Marshall

See also
 Clavering hundred

References

External links

Villages in Norfolk
South Norfolk
Civil parishes in Norfolk